Mischa Zverev was the defending champion but chose not to defend his title.

Frances Tiafoe won the title after defeating Tennys Sandgren 6–3, 6–4 in the final.

In a viral moment, Frances Tiafoe's first-round match against Mitchell Krueger was repeatedly interrupted by the sounds of sexual intercourse.

Seeds

Draw

Finals

Top half

Bottom half

References

Main draw
Qualifying draw

2017 ATP Challenger Tour
2017 Singles